Footsteps in the Night is a 1957 American film noir crime film directed by Jean Yarbrough and starring Bill Elliott, Don Haggerty and Eleanore Tanin. It was the last in a series of five films made by Allied Artists featuring Elliott as a police detective.

Plot

Cast
 Bill Elliott as Lt. Andy Doyle  
 Don Haggerty as Sgt. Mike Duncan  
 Eleanore Tanin as Mary Raiken  
 Douglas Dick as Henry Johnson  
 James Flavin as Mr. Bradbury  
 Gregg Palmer as Pat Orvello  
 Harry Tyler as Dick Harris, Sunset Villa Manager
 Ann Griffith as June Wright  
 Robert Shayne  as Fred Horner
 Forrest Taylor as Shaw, Sunset Vista Manager

See also
Dial Red O (1955)
Sudden Danger (1955)
Calling Homicide (1956)
Chain of Evidence (1957)
List of American films of 1957

References

Bibliography
 Mayer, Geoff. Encyclopedia of American Film Serials. McFarland, 13 2017.

External links

1957 films
1957 crime films
American crime films
1950s English-language films
Films directed by Jean Yarbrough
Allied Artists films
1950s American films